General David Sejusa (born 13 November 1954) (aka David Tinyefuza) is a Ugandan lawyer, military officer and politician. He was the coordinator of intelligence services and a senior presidential adviser to President of Uganda Yoweri Museveni. He served as army commander and also a member of High Command UPDF, the UPDF defense council and a member of parliament representing the Uganda People's Defence Force. He had a falling out with Museveni and formed the Freedom and Unity Front in exile in the United Kingdom following being charged for plotting a coup where he has been allegedly planning anti-government activities by the Museveni government.

Early and personal life
Tinyefuza attended Nyakasura High School. He holds the degree of Bachelor of Laws Honours (LLB) and Master of Laws (LLM) from Makerere University. He also attended the Law Development Centre for the Diploma in Legal Practice where he left after a clerkship for cadet training in Tanzania. He was also a student leader(head of students Guild) at Makerere University. A resident of Mitchel Hall at the university. He has obtained the senior command qualifications of PSC from the Uganda Senior Command and Staff College at Kimaka, Jinja, Uganda. He also holds a Certificate in Information Technology from an institution in Canada. He also attended the Police Cadet Course in Tanzania and Senior Command Strategic Course.

He is married to Juliet Tinyefuza.

Name change
On 17 February 2012, David Tinyefuza officially changed his name to David Sejusa. He said that Sejusa is a family name that is also reflected on some of his academic documents but that he had abandoned it "around secondary school level" but that he would re-claim as "everybody back home" refers to him as such. He added: "There is nothing in reverting to my original name. It is comrades like you who didn’t know it was my name but those elder comrades have always referred to me as such. And I suggest that from today you quote me as Gen. David Sejusa."

The Sejusa name is a Luganda rendering that is loosely translated as "I have no regrets;" it also has the same meaning in the Ankole rendition of Tinyefuza, which he said was a reason to take a new identity.

Military career
Prior to 1981, David Tinyefuza was a policeman with the Uganda Police Force serving as Assistant Superintendent of Police. In 1981, he became a combatant in the Uganda Bush War between the Uganda National Liberation Army (UNLA) of Milton Obote and the National Resistance Army (NRA) of Yoweri Museveni, from 1981 until 1986. For a period of 10 years following the victory of the NRA in 1986, he served as a member of the National Resistance Army Council (NRAC) and the National Executive Committee (NEC). Between 1989 and 1992, he served as Minister of State for Defense. In 1993, he was appointed Presidential Adviser on Peace and Security, serving in that capacity until 1997. He was appointed Senior Presidential Adviser and Coordinator of Intelligence in 2005, a position he held until 2013.

On 31st August 2022, Sejusa with other 34 generals were retired from the UPDF

Politics
The party was founded in November 2013 with an official announcement later made in London, United Kingdom, where former General David Sejusa was in exile. Sejusa said of President Yoweri Museveni: "He's had enough time. He can leave and go, and we start a new process of national healing. And we are organising ourselves, we are establishing a constitutional rule which he destroyed." Sejusa denied seeking the presidency and said that it was "a waste of time" to run against Museveni within the structures of the current system. Two months earlier, Museveni challenged Sejusa to try to overthrow him, but added that whoever uses violence would be stopped. "If Sejusa wants to use force, let him come." In turn, Sejusa responded to questions of whether he would use force to bring change and said: "It's not so much that we want to do so. But if he continues to unleash terror on the population ours will be self defence."

Following a rift with the establishment in May 2013 about Ugandan President Yoweri Museveni's son, Muhoozi Kainerugaba, over allegation of nepotism and that he would eventually simply replace his father as president, a motion Kainerugaba denied, he founded the Freedom and Unity Front. Sejusa had earlier called on Ugandans to "build alternative capacity" and remove Museveni. He added, the week following his departure as an MP representing the military, that "no one should imagine that Museveni will be removed through elections."

References

1954 births
Living people
Ugandan generals
Members of the Parliament of Uganda
Makerere University alumni
Uganda Senior Command and Staff College alumni
Government ministers of Uganda